List of Rulers "Chikulamayembe" of Nkamanga (Malawi):

References

Government of Malawi
History of Malawi
Nkamanga
Malawi history-related lists